Nam Ik-Kyung (born 26 January 1983) is a South Korean retired football player. In March 2009 he signed a tryout agreement with Finnish team JJK.

Career statistics
As of 28 February 2011 (UTC)

References

External links
 Tilastohistoria 
 

1983 births
Living people
Association football forwards
South Korean footballers
Pohang Steelers players
Gimcheon Sangmu FC players
JJK Jyväskylä players
FC Haka players
K League 1 players
Veikkausliiga players
South Korean expatriates in Finland
Expatriate footballers in Finland